Stavros Zarokostas (born 5 November 1997) is a Greek professional footballer who plays as a forward for FC Haka in the Finnish top-tier Veikkausliiga.

Career

Charleston Battery
Zarokostas was selected by the New York Red Bulls in the 3rd round (62nd overall) of the 2020 MLS SuperDraft, however he wasn't signed by the club. In May 2020, Zarokostas signed with USL Championship club Charleston Battery. He made his league debut for the club on 19 July 2020, coming on as a 79th-minute substitute for Nicque Daley in a 2-1 home defeat to the Birmingham Legion.

Haka
On 31 January 2022, Zarokostas signed a contract with FC Haka in Finland for the 2022 season, with an option for 2023.

References

External links
Stavros Zarokostas at USL Championship

1997 births
Living people
Charleston Battery players
FC Haka players
USL Championship players
Greek footballers
Association football forwards
Greek expatriate footballers
Greek expatriate sportspeople in the United States
Expatriate soccer players in the United States
Greek expatriate sportspeople in Finland
Expatriate footballers in Finland
Rhode Island Rams men's soccer players
Soccer players from Rhode Island
New York Red Bulls draft picks
National Premier Soccer League players
People from Leonidio
People from Coventry, Rhode Island
Footballers from the Peloponnese